Olenina is an extinct suborder of the trilobite order Ptychopariida.

Subdivisions
Superfamily Olenoidea
Family Ellipsocephaloididae
Family Olenidae
Superfamily Incertae sedis 
Genus Triarthrus

References

 
Ptychopariida
Arthropod suborders